The 1972–77 Nordic Football Championship was the eleventh Nordic Football Championship staged. Four Nordic countries participated: Denmark, Finland, Norway and Sweden. Sweden won the tournament, its ninth Nordic Championship win.

Results

1972

1973

1974

1975

1976

1977

Table 
The table is compiled by awarding two points for a victory, one point for a draw, and no points for a loss.

Winners

Statistics

Goalscorers

See also
Balkan CupBaltic CupCentral European International CupMediterranean Cup

References

Sources 

1972-77
1972–73 in European football
1973–74 in European football
1974–75 in European football
1975–76 in European football
1976–77 in European football
1972 in Swedish football
1973 in Swedish football
1974 in Swedish football
1975 in Swedish football
1976 in Swedish football
1977 in Swedish football
1972 in Danish football
1973 in Danish football
1974 in Danish football
1975 in Danish football
1976 in Danish football
1977 in Danish football
1972 in Norwegian football
1973 in Norwegian football
1974 in Norwegian football
1975 in Norwegian football
1976 in Norwegian football
1977 in Norwegian football
1972 in Finnish football
1973 in Finnish football
1974 in Finnish football
1975 in Finnish football
1976 in Finnish football
1977 in Finnish football